The 2006 Commonwealth Games Triathlon events were held on March 18, 2006 in the Melbourne suburb of St. Kilda, which plays host to most triathlon events held in Melbourne.

Both men's and women's courses were conducted over the Olympic distance of 1500 m swim, 40 km ride and 10 km run, and were held according to the International Triathlon Union (ITU) rules.

Men's competition

Women's competition

Medal table

See also
Triathlon at the 2002 Commonwealth Games

External links
Official 2006 Commonwealth Games Triathlon page

2006 Commonwealth Games events
Commonwealth Games
2006